The 1977–78 Auburn Tigers men's basketball team represented Auburn University in the 1977–78 college basketball season. The team's head coach was Bob Davis, who was in his fifth season at Auburn. The team played their home games at Memorial Coliseum in Auburn, Alabama. They finished the season 13–14, 8–10 in SEC play.

After the season, Davis retired from coaching and Paul Lambert from Southern Illinois University was hired as his replacement.  However, Lambert died in a hotel fire on June 6, 1978 before ever coaching a game for the Tigers.

References

Auburn Tigers men's basketball seasons
Auburn
Auburn Tigers
Auburn Tigers